Leah Keiser (born September 13, 1997) is an American former figure skater. She is the 2012 JGP Turkey gold medalist.

Personal life 
Leah Keiser was born in Pittsburgh, Pennsylvania. She has a sister, Emily, a half-sister, Stephanie, and two half-brothers, Alex and Thomas, who play in the NFL for the San Diego Chargers.  Leah now attends Northwestern University  studying chemical engineering with plans to graduate in the spring of 2020.

Career 
Keiser debuted on the ISU Junior Grand Prix series in the 2012–13 season. She won gold in Istanbul, Turkey and placed fourth in her next event, in Chemnitz, Germany. She qualified for the JGP Final in Sochi, Russia, where she finished 6th. She withdrew from the 2013 U.S. Championships.

Keiser finished tenth at the 2014 U.S. Championships. During the 2014–15 JGP series, she won a bronze medal in Ljubljana, Slovenia and then competed in Dresden, Germany.

Programs

Competitive highlights

2009–present

2007–2009

Detailed results

References

External links 

 
 Leah Keiser at IceNetwork

1997 births
American female single skaters
Living people
Sportspeople from Pittsburgh
21st-century American women